The Dictionnaire des ouvrages anonymes et pseudonymes whose full title is Dictionnaire des ouvrages anonymes et pseudonymes composés, traduits ou publiés en français, avec les noms des auteurs, traducteurs et éditeurs, is a four volume (1806—1809) dictionary by Antoine Alexandre Barbier listing pen names for French and Latin authors.

External links 
On Google Books :
 1806 edition: tome I, tome II, tome III, tome IV
 1822 edition: tome I, tome II, tome III, tome IV

On Internet Archive :
 édition de 1872 : tome I, tome II, tome III, tome IV
 édition de 1882 : tome I, tome II, tome III, tome IV

Book series introduced in 1806
1806 non-fiction books
1807 non-fiction books
1808 non-fiction books
1809 non-fiction books
Ouvrages anonymes et pseudonymes